Somsakdi Boontud (Thai: สมศักดิ์ บุญทัต, born 24 November 1952) is a retired Thai sprinter who specialized in the 4 × 100 m relay. In this event he won gold medals at the Asian Games in 1974 and 1978, and four silver medals at the Asian Games and Championships between 1979 and 1983. He competed at the 1972 and 1976 Summer Olympics, but failed to reach the finals. Individually he qualified for the 1975 Asian Championships in the 200 m, but withdrew due to injury.

References

1952 births
Living people
Somsak Boontud
Somsak Boontud
Asian Games medalists in athletics (track and field)
Athletes (track and field) at the 1974 Asian Games
Athletes (track and field) at the 1978 Asian Games
Athletes (track and field) at the 1982 Asian Games
Somsak Boontud
Somsak Boontud
Medalists at the 1974 Asian Games
Medalists at the 1978 Asian Games
Medalists at the 1982 Asian Games
Athletes (track and field) at the 1972 Summer Olympics
Athletes (track and field) at the 1976 Summer Olympics
Southeast Asian Games medalists in athletics
Somsak Boontud
Somsak Boontud
Competitors at the 1977 Southeast Asian Games
Somsak Boontud
Somsak Boontud